Albania has 2,972 villages ( or ) as of 2016. Albania has reformed its internal administrative divisions 21 times since its Declaration of Independence from the Ottoman Empire in 1912. Following the most recent reorganization, enacted in 2014 and carried out in June 2015, Albania's 12 counties were entirely divided into 61 municipalities for regional government and 373 administrative units for local government. These administrative units, communes, towns now oversee most government at the village level.

The Albanian Institute of Statistics stopped providing comprehensive population data for villages after the 1989 census, and as of now the administrative units comprise the lowest official level of division in Albania.

List

 Villages of Berat County
 Villages of Dibër County
 Villages of Durrës County
 Villages of Elbasan County
 Villages of Fier County
 Villages of Gjirokastër County
 Villages of Korçë County
 Villages of Kukës County
 Villages of Lezhë County
 Villages of Shkodër County
 Villages of Tirana County
 Villages of Vlorë County

References